Lin Gui is the pinyin romanization of various Chinese names. It may refer to:

 Lin Gui (official), an intendant of Shanghai under the Qing dynasty
 Lin Gui (table tennis), table tennis player